was a Japanese chemist and businessman. He is known as the founder of Japan's whisky industry and Nikka Whisky Distilling.

Born to a family that had owned a sake brewery since 1733, he traveled to Scotland in 1918 to study organic chemistry and distilling. He then returned to Japan establishing a whisky distillery at Suntory and founded his own distilling company, Nikka Whisky, in 1934.

Early life 

Masataka Taketsuru was born on June 20, 1894 in Takehara, Hiroshima, to a family that had owned a sake brewery since 1733.

Experiences in Scotland
In December 1918, he arrived in Scotland and enrolled at the University of Glasgow, where he studied organic chemistry in the summer of 1919. Taketsuru studied under Thomas Stewart Patterson, the Gardiner Chair of Chemistry.

In April 1919, Taketsuru began his apprenticeship at Longmorn distillery in Strathspey, Scotland, and then in July at James Calder & Co.'s Bo'ness distillery in the Lowlands region. On 8 January 1920, he married Jessie Roberta "Rita" Cowan of Middlecroft, Kirkintilloch, despite opposition from both their families. Initially, they lived in Campbeltown and his last apprenticeship began in May 1920 at Hazelburn distillery (purchased in 1920 by Mackie & Co., then owners of Springbank) before moving to Japan later in November 1920 via New York and Seattle.

Return to Japan

After returning to Japan, Taketsuru worked at Kotobukiya, which would later become Suntory, where he helped establish a whisky distillery just outside of Kyoto. In 1934 he founded his own distilling company, Dai Nippon Kaju K.K., in Yoichi on the northern Japanese island of Hokkaido. He believed that this part of Japan was the most similar to Scotland. He later renamed the company Nikka. Nikka whisky was first sold in October 1940. Taketsuru's wife, Rita, died in January 1961, of liver disease. Taketsuru died in 1979. He is buried in Yoichi together with his wife.

See also
Massan - NHK Asadora (morning drama) television series inspired by the life of Taketsuru and his wife Rita

References

Further reading

External links
 Japanese Whisky History (1854-1918) - The Jurassic Period to 1980s
 Masataka Taketsuru's entry in the University of Glasgow matriculation book in 1919
 Nikka website

1894 births
1979 deaths
20th-century Japanese businesspeople
Japanese whisky
Alumni of the University of Glasgow
Osaka University alumni
People from Hiroshima Prefecture
Whisky blenders